Anup Jalota, (born 29 July 1953) is an Indian singer, musician and actor, best known for his contributions to the Bhajan genre of Indian Music. He is popularly known as the "Bhajan Samraat" (Emperor of Bhajans). 
Padma Shri was conferred upon him by Government of India in 2012. He was a contestant on the reality show Bigg Boss 12.

Early life and background

Anup Jalota was born in Nainital, Uttrakhand a renowned exponent of bhajan and hails from the Sham Chowrasi Gharana of Punjab. He was educated in Lucknow's Bhatkhande Music Institute.  His father, Purshottam Das Jalota, was also a prominent Bhajan singer. He also spent few years in Savarkundla, Gujarat in his early days. He has two younger brothers, Anil Jalota and Ajay Jalota and two sisters, Anjali Dhir and Anita Mehra. Ajay currently lives in California.

Career
Jalota started his musical career as a chorus singer in All India Radio. He is usually backed by a santoor player, dholak player, sarod player, sarangi player, violinist, sitar player, tabla player and guitarist. Some of his popular bhajans include Aisi Lagi Lagan, Main Nahi Makhan Khayo, Rang De Chunariya, Jag Me Sundar Hai Do Naam, and Chadariya Jhini Re Jhini. He was also the presenter of the program Dharam Aur Hum, telecast in Star Plus from 2002 to 2005.
He met Jagadguru Shree Kripaluji Maharaj in Mumbai and agreed to release several CDs of his compositions. In 2008 he recorded the title song "Golden Memorable Yaadein" for the CD "Noorani Chehra", produced by Shaukat (Sam) Kassam to commemorate the Golden Jubilee of the Aga Khan.

On 16 September 2018, Jalota entered Bigg Boss house in its twelfth season, as a contestant, along with Jasleen Matharu.

Personal life

Jalota's first marriage was to Sonali Sheth, a Gujarati girl who was then a music student and later a singer. They married without his family's approval. The couple became popular in the North Indian live performance circuit as "Anup and Sonali Jalota," which disbanded after their divorce.

His second marriage was an arranged one, to Bina Bhatia, which too ended in divorce. Anup's third marriage was to Medha Gujral, niece of former Indian Prime Minister I. K. Gujral and director Shekhar Kapur's first wife whom he had divorced in 1994. Anup and Medha have a son named Aryaman (born in 1996), who studied at Princeton University. Medha died on 25 November 2014 in New York City of renal failure following a second heart and first kidney transplant.

It came to light in 2018 that he had been in a relationship with Bigg Boss 12 contestant Jasleen Matharu, who is thirty-seven years younger than him. They had been together at least three and a half years prior. However, after getting evicted from the house, Anup said their relationship was only of a teacher and student.

Discography
The popular Bhajans and ghazals for which he is credited the most are given below
 Aisi Lagi Lagan
 Chaand Angdaiyaan Le Raha Hai
 Tumhare Shahar Ka Mausam
 Jag Mein Sundar Hai Do Naam
 Kabhi Kabhi Bhagwan Ko Bhi
 Tere Man Mein Raam
 Main Nazar Se Pee Raha Hoon
 Hum Se Achi to Kahin Aaine ki Khismat Hogi
 Rukh Se Parda Hata De
 La Pila De Saqiya
 Shree Hanuman Chalisa
 Noorani Chehra (Ismaili Devotional songs)
 Mere Kabr Par Pate Huye
 Tum Kya Samjho Tum Kya Jano
 Kategi Ye Zindagi Ab Rote Rote
 Laga Chunari Mein Daag
 Rang De Chunariya
 Prabhuji Tum Chandan Hum Pani
 Suraj ki Garmi Se
 Bhajan prabhat
 Devonix with Kunal Saha
Hot and Spicy with Sundar Popo
Bhagwan Mere Bhagwan with Satyam Anandjee

Tracks

Filmography

Television

Films

References

External links

Mysticamusic
Hindi Bhajans of Anoop Jalota (archived)

1953 births
Living people
University of Lucknow alumni
Bhajan singers
Indian male ghazal singers
People from Nainital
Recipients of the Padma Shri in arts
20th-century Indian male singers
20th-century Indian singers
Bigg Boss (Hindi TV series) contestants
Recipients of the Sangeet Natak Akademi Award